A clothing swap is a type of swapmeet wherein participants exchange their valued but no longer used clothing for clothing they will use. Clothing swaps are considered not only a good way to refill one's wardrobe, but also are considered an act of environmentalism. It is also used to get rid of and obtain specialist clothing. Participants have numerous motivations but also face barriers during swaps. These events are becoming more and more popular for numerous reasons.

A clothing swap party is an event in which people gather [and invite friends] to exchange used clothing in order to promote sustainable consumption. By borrowing and lending, one can acquire additional clothing without incurring additional costs.

Description 

The notion of swapping is not a new concept. The word swap implies and means there is no money involved in the process. Clothing swaps occur formally, such as an exclusive women's event or informally exchanging clothes with a sibling. Who a swap occurs with is essentially up to the swappers. The process has two main features. The first is the process of obtaining clothes then, the swap being facilitated. These occur in person as well as via the Internet; clothing swaps have adapted as society continually changes. In order to have a successful swap it is important to have donation guidelines and swap rules.

Clothing swaps originated in 1994 in San Francisco California with events hosted by Suzanne Agasi of ClothingSwap.com. She has personally hosted over 310 events promoting green glamour, sharing and enhancing and refreshing your wardrobe with others. Throughout the period of clothing swaps, participants tend to be women.  Many participants see this as a wonderful opportunity to shop second hand.

Motives 
Swap participants chose to engage in swaps for a multitude of reasons. The three overarching motives can be categorized as environmental, economic, and social. Clothing swaps allow for clothes that would be discarded into the trash to recycle into someone else's closet. Out of concern for the environment, many swappers use this approach to addressing textile environmental impacts. Fashion is one of the globes leading waste contributors and swaps are encouraged in order to reduce this waste. From an economic perspective, swappers can obtain new clothing articles without having to spend money. It makes sense to save money but receive new articles of clothing at the same time. Socially, swappers can connect with other people passionate about swapping as well as experience extroverted settings.

Barriers 
Some factors limit participation in clothing swaps- social outlooks and quality concerns. When obtaining second-hand clothing, certain members of society see this as a new social label. They believe that their social status depends on whether their closets are full of first vs. second-hand clothing. Second-hand clothing can be interpreted by others as a lack of wealth. To address this there are designer quality swaps. Quality concerns also arise during swaps. Swap participants want to ensure clothing items are of good quality and have not deteriorated from prior use. When shopping second hand the clothes are used and some members of society do not want to swap their belongings for an item of worse quality. To address this issue swap hosts can check the quality of items contributed to a swap.

See also 
 Collaborative consumption
 Swishing
 Second-hand shop

References 

Recycling
Charity events